Zahir Shehzad (born 23 September 1998) is an Afghan cricketer. He made his List A debut for Amo Region in the 2017 Ghazi Amanullah Khan Regional One Day Tournament on 10 August 2017. He made his first-class debut for Speen Ghar Region in the 2017–18 Ahmad Shah Abdali 4-day Tournament on 20 October 2017, taking five wickets for 119 runs in the second innings. He finished the 2017–18 Ahmad Shah Abdali 4-day Tournament as the joint-leading wicket-taker, with a total of 55 wickets.

He made his Twenty20 debut for Kabul Zwanan in the 2018–19 Afghanistan Premier League on 5 October 2018.

References

External links
 

1998 births
Living people
Afghan cricketers
Amo Sharks cricketers
Kabul Zwanan cricketers
Spin Ghar Tigers cricketers
Place of birth missing (living people)